Manufahi is one of the municipalities of East Timor. It has a population of 53,691 (2015 census) and an area of 1,323 km2. The capital of the municipality is Same.

Etymology
The present name of the municipality, Manufahi, is derived from Maun Fahe, the Tetum language expression for 'divided brothers'. The name originated in a legend that tells of a fight between two related tribes, or a group of siblings. Eventually, the protagonists agreed to subject themselves to a single ruler.

During the Portuguese colonial era, the then district bore the name of its main town, Same. The present name was adopted on the basis of the divided brothers legend. However, it was misspelled, and the Tetum language meaning of the misspelled name is 'pig chicken'.

Efforts are being made to correct the name. However, there is also a legend that in the suco of  a rooster once flew down from a mountain, landed on the back of a pig, and then travelled with the pig to many places before returning home.

Geography
Manufahi extends from the central highlands of East Timor to its south coast, on the Timor Sea. It is bordered by Manatuto to the east, Ainaro to the west, and Aileu to the north.

History
During its time as a Portuguese colony, the municipality was called Same, after the capital city. It was the epicentre of the Great Rebellion of 1910–12. During the Indonesian occupation the then subdistrict of Hato-Udo was split off from the then district of Manufahi and joined to Ainaro, and the then subdistrict of Turiscai, previously in Ainaro, was moved to Manufahi.

Administrative posts
Manufahi's administrative posts (formerly sub-districts) are:
Alas
Fatuberlio
Same
Turiscai

Demographics
Besides the national official languages of Tetum and Portuguese, the Malayo-Polynesian language Mambai is also spoken.

References

Notes

Bibliography

External links 

  – official site (in Tetum with some content in English)
  – information page on Ministry of State Administration site 

 
Municipalities of East Timor